Yashin or Yashina (feminine) is a Russian surname that is derived from Yasha, a diminutive of the male given name Yakov, and literally means Yasha's. It may refer to:

 Alexander Yashin (1913–1968), Russian poet and writer
 Alexei Yashin (born 1973), Russian NHL ice hockey player
 Ekaterina Yashina (born 1993), Russian tennis player
 Ilya Yashin (born 1983), Russian politician
 Lev Yashin (1929–1990), Russian football (soccer) goalkeeper
 Yashin Award, a FIFA award named in his honor
 Yashin (band), Scottish post-hardcore band.

See also
 Yashino

Russian-language surnames